The 15 cm schwere Feldhaubitze 18 or sFH 18 (German: "heavy field howitzer, model 18"), nicknamed Immergrün ("Evergreen"), was the basic German division-level heavy howitzer of 149mm during the Second World War, serving alongside the smaller but more numerous 10.5 cm leFH 18. Its mobility and firing range and the effectiveness of its 44 kilogram shell made it the most important weapon of all German infantry divisions. A total of 6,756 examples were produced.

It replaced the earlier, First World War-era design of the 15 cm sFH 13, which was judged by the Krupp-Rheinmetall designer team of the sFH 18 as completely inadequate. The sFH 18 was twice as heavy as its predecessor, had a muzzle velocity increase of forty percent, a maximum firing range 4.5 kilometers greater, and a new split-trail gun carriage that increased the firing traverse twelvefold. The secret development from 1926–1930 allowed German industry to deliver a trouble-free design at the beginning of German re-armament in 1933. It was the first artillery weapon equipped with rocket-assisted ammunition to increase range. The sFH 18 was also used in the self-propelled artillery piece schwere Panzerhaubitze 18/1 (more commonly known as Hummel).

The sFH 18 was one of Germany's three main 15 cm calibre weapons, the others being the 15 cm Kanone 18, a corps-level heavy gun, and the 15 cm sIG 33, a short-barreled infantry gun.

Design and development

Development work on the sFH 18 began in 1926 and the gun was ready for production by 1933. The model year was an attempt at camouflage. The gun originated with a contest between Rheinmetall and Krupp, both of whom entered several designs that were all considered unsatisfactory for one reason or another. In the end the army decided the solution was to combine the best features of both designs, using the Rheinmetall gun on a Krupp carriage.

The carriage was a relatively standard split-trail design with box legs. Spades were carried on the sides of the legs that could be mounted onto the ends for added stability. The carriage also saw use on the 10 cm schwere Kanone 18 gun. As the howitzer was designed for horse towing, it used an unsprung axle and hard rubber tires. A two-wheel bogie was introduced to allow it to be towed, but the lack of suspension made it unsuitable for towing at high speed.

The gun was officially introduced into service on 23 May 1935, and by the outbreak of war the Wehrmacht had about 1,353 of these guns in service. Production continued throughout the war, reaching a peak of 2,295 guns in 1944. In 1944, the howitzer cost 40,400 RM, 9 months and 5,500 man-hours to make.

Variants

Several other versions of the basic 15 cm were produced:

The 15 cm sFH 36 was a version with a greatly reduced  weight that was an attempt to improve mobility, but as it used various light alloys to achieve this saving it was considered too costly to continue production.
The 15 cm sFH 40 was another improved version, featuring a slightly longer barrel and a new carriage that was suitable for vehicle towing and allowed the barrel to have wider firing angles and thereby improve range up to 15,400 m. However this version was even heavier than the sFH 18 (at ) and was found to be too difficult to use in the field. Some of these barrels were later fitted to existing sFH 18 carriages, creating the sFH 18/40. 
A further modification was the sFH 18/43, which changed to a split breech that allowed for the use of bagged charges instead of requiring the gunners to first put the charges into casings. 
Two further attempts to introduce a newer 15 cm piece followed, but neither the 15 cm sFH 43 or 15 cm sFH 44 progressed past the stage of wooden mock-ups.

Combat record

The first field combat for the 15 cm sFH 18 was with the Chinese National Revolutionary Army in the Second Sino-Japanese War. The Chinese were desperately short on artillery guns and other heavy weapons, but the few 15 cm sFH 18 units the Chinese did have hopelessly outclassed their Japanese counterparts which were mainly the Type 38 15 cm howitzer and Type 4 15 cm howitzer, forcing the Japanese to introduce the Type 96 15 cm Howitzer. Some earlier pieces (about 24) of sFH18 in China were designed specially with a 32/L barrel, known as sFH18 32/L; the maximum range was increased to 15 km.

Against the Soviet Union, the sFH 18 lacked the range of the Red Army 152 mm ML-20 gun-howitzer, its maximum range of  allowed it to fire counter-battery against the sFH 18 with a    advantage. This led to numerous efforts to introduce new guns with even better performance than the ML-20, while various experiments were also carried out on the sFH 18 to improve its range. These led to the 15 cm sFH 18M version with a removable barrel liner and a muzzle brake that allowed a larger "special 7" or 8 charge to be used. This led to the introduction of the 15 cm R. Gr. 19 FES ammunition, which used a rocket-assisted round that could reach  and give it some level of parity with the ML-20.

Several countries continued fielding the sFH 18 after the war in large numbers including Czechoslovakia, Portugal and many South American and Central American countries. Finland bought 48 sFH 18 howitzers from Germany in 1940 and designated them 150 H/40. These guns were modernized in 1988 as the 152 H 88, and they were used by the Finnish Army until 2007.

Versions

15 cm sFH 18 – standard version
15 cm sFH 36 - lightened version
15 cm sFH 18M – modification of sFH-18 with muzzle brake and replaceable barrel liner
15 cm sFH 18/40 – sFH 40 barrels on sFH 18 carriages
15 cm sFH 18/43 – a sFH 18 development to accept bag charge with sliding-block breech
15 cm sFH 18/32L – Chinese (Republic of China) version with longer barrel and longer range of 15 km
152 mm houfnice vz.18/47 – Post-war Czech modification with a shorter barrel that was rebored to 152 mm, and a double-baffle muzzle brake.
152 H 88-40 – Finnish modernization with a lengthened 152-mm barrel and a muzzle brake

Operators

 – post war use
 – post war use, known as D-30 "Krup" 150mm

 Czechoslovakia – post war use
 – 48 pieces, known as 150 H/40
 Nazi Germany
 – known as Cannone da 149/28
 – post war use
 – post war use
 Spain – 1937–39 and Blue Division
 – post war use
 Indonesia – post war use
 – post war use

See also
152 mm howitzer-gun M1937 (ML-20) – Soviet 152 mm howitzer
BL 5.5 inch Medium Gun – British gun of similar size
10 cm schwere Kanone 18

References

Citations

Sources 

 Book

External links 
 

150 mm artillery
World War II field artillery
World War II artillery of Germany
World War II artillery of Italy
World War II weapons of China
Krupp
Rheinmetall
World War II howitzers
Military equipment introduced in the 1930s